Phyllonorycter hagenii is a moth of the family Gracillariidae. It is known from Québec in Canada and Illinois, Massachusetts, Kentucky, Michigan, New York, Vermont and Connecticut in the United States.

The wingspan is 7.5–10 mm.

The larvae feed on Quercus species, including Quercus alba, Quercus bicolor, Quercus castanea and Quercus prinus. They mine the leaves of their host plant. The mine has the form of a tentiform mine on the upperside the leaf. The pupa is suspended in a few silken threads.

References

hagenii
Moths of North America
Moths described in 1873